The 1984–85 FIS Cross-Country World Cup was the 4th official World Cup season in cross-country skiing for men and women. The World Cup began in Cogne, Italy on 9 December 1984 and finished in Oslo, Norway on 17 March 1985. Gunde Svan of Sweden won the overall men's cup, and Anette Bøe of Norway won the women's.

Calendar

Men

Women

Men's team events

Women's team events

NOTE: Races marked with a star (*) counts officially for both as "FIS World Cup" and "FIS Nordic World Ski Championships" wins statistics.

Overall standings

Men's standings

Women's standings

Medal table

Achievements
First World Cup career victory

Men
  Ove Aunli, 28, in his 4th season – the WC 2 (30 km) in Davos; first podium was 1983–84 WC 2 (30 km) in Ramsau
  Kari Härkönen, 23, in his 4th season – the WC 4 (15 km) in Seefeld; also first podium

Women
  Grete Ingeborg Nykkelmo, 23, in her 4th season – the WC 5 (20 km) in Ramsau; first podium was 1984–85 WC 2 (10 km) in Davos
  Marie Risby, 29, in her 4th season – the WC 9 (5 km) in Lahti; first podium was 1982–83 WC 2 (10 km) in Klingenthal

Victories in this World Cup (all-time number of victories as of 1984–85 season in parentheses)

Men
 , 5 (11) first places
 , 2 (2) first places
 , 1 (3) first place
 , 1 (2) first place
 , 1 (1) first place

Women
 , 6 (8) first place
 , 1 (4) first place
 , 1 (3) first place
 , 1 (6) first place
 , 1 (1) first place
 , 1 (1) first place

References

FIS Cross-Country World Cup seasons
World Cup 1984-85
World Cup 1984-85